Deep Cuts is the 18th studio release, and 16th full-length studio album, by Christian alternative rock band the Choir, released on April 23, 2021. This album was funded by the band's Kickstarter campaign launched in February 2020, and was their first album of new material without contributions from long-time bassist Tim Chandler, who died in 2018; bass duties were split between session player Chris Donohue and bassist Steven Mason from Jars of Clay. The double-disc vinyl version includes five additional tracks that were previously released as digital singles in 2019 and 2020.

Critical reception

Critical reviews for Deep Cuts were generally favorable, and focused primarily on the upbeat nature of the album compared to its immediate predecessor.  Dan McIntosh from CCM Magazine called the album "a positive emotional space," saying that The Choir has been "a good friend to many of us, and we’re so thankful it continues to keep this musical conversation going."  John Underdown at Jesus Freak Hideout also thought that Deep Cuts featured "a newer, brighter message [...] focused on pushing for better times and reconciliation." However, he saw this as a weakness compared to the band's previous work: "Deep Cuts is more laid back and simply exists because these guys love making music together. That's fine, but it feels like a middle-of-the-road Choir album."  Levi Yager from The Heartland Attack agreed, saying that "while Deep Cuts may not be The Choir’s best work, it’s certainly no failure."  Andre Salles from True Tunes was more favorable, emphasizing that the album's kintsugi cover art was representative of its more complex emotional theme: "about how love makes us whole, but also about how the scars we carry from our pain make us even more beautiful. It is the love songs that give this album its character." The strongest review came from Brian Q. Newcomb at The Fire Note, calling Deep Cuts "an altogether more up-tempo effort that rocks with intentionality and purpose," and saying that the song "“The Woods,” with an aggressive guitar attack and a gripping sax solo, is a welcome return to an intensity reminiscent of the band’s great, underrated ’93 release, Kissers and Killers.”

Track listing
All tracks written by Derri Daugherty and Steve Hindalong except where noted.

Personnel 
The Choir
 Derri Daugherty - lead vocals, electric guitar, acoustic guitar, keyboards
 Steve Hindalong - drums, percussion, harmonica, glockenspiel, gong, vocals, lead vocals on "Kathie's Garden" and "The Real WWW"
 Dan Michaels - saxophone, lyricon, horn samples

Guest performers
 Tim Chandler - bass ("The Real WWW", "What You Think I Am"), electric guitar ("The Real WWW")
 Marc Byrd - electric guitar ("What You Think I Am")
 Leigh Nash - vocals ("What You Think I Am," "After All (Re-imagined)")
 Matt Slocum - cello ("After All (Re-imagined)")
 Stephen Leiweke - acoustic guitar
 Jonathan Noel - vocals
 Mason Zgoda - vocals
 Stephen Mason - vocals, bass ("Eyes On Fire," "Mystical World," "Kathie's Garden," "Counting Stars")
 Chris Donohue - bass
 Andy Prickett - electric guitar ("Hurricane," "Feel You Close," "Aces Over Eights," "Deep Cuts")
 Michael Walker - electric guitar ("Kindred Spirits," "Sunshine Girl")
 Jared Norris - Keyboards ("The Fool," "Deep Cuts")
 Mark Uecker - twelve-string guitar ("Sunshine Girl")
 John Steingard - programming ("After All (Re-imagined)")
 Spooky - dog vocals ("Reckless Ways")
 Hotcake - dog vocals ("Reckless Ways")
 Erica Estes - voice [Angelic Laughter On Outro] ("Feel You Close")
 Christopher Heyn - voice ["You Are Beautiful, Hit It"] ("Deep Cuts")

Production
 Derri Daugherty - producer, engineer
 Stephen Leiweke - producer, engineer, mixing
 Steve Hindalong - producer
 Dan Michaels - executive producer
 Kimberly Uecker - executive producer
 Lisa Michaels - executive producer, handler
 Mark Uecker - executive producer
 Nigel Palmer - mastering
 Todd Evans – cover art, design

References

2021 albums
The Choir (alternative rock band) albums
Galaxy21 Music albums